Javier Menéndez Fernández  (born June 18, 1981, in Havana, Ciudad de La Habana, Cuba) is a Spanish fencer. He competed in the individual foil events at the 2008 Summer Olympics, where he seeded 18th. He won a bronze medal at the 2005 Almería Mediterranean games.

References

1981 births
Living people
Spanish male foil fencers
Olympic fencers of Spain
Fencers at the 2008 Summer Olympics
Mediterranean Games bronze medalists for Spain
Mediterranean Games medalists in fencing
Competitors at the 2005 Mediterranean Games